The Bonda is a right tributary of the river Crișul Repede in Romania. It discharges into the Crișul Repede in Fughiu.

References

Rivers of Romania
Rivers of Bihor County